Theodorus Petrus "Theo" Blankenaauw (also Blankenauw, 5 September 1923 – 28 August 2011) was a Dutch track cyclist. He competed at the 1948 Summer Olympics in the 1 km time trial and the 4 km team pursuit and finished in 12th place in the time trial.

See also
 List of Dutch Olympic cyclists

References

1923 births
2011 deaths
Olympic cyclists of the Netherlands
Cyclists at the 1948 Summer Olympics
Dutch male cyclists
People from Gennep
Cyclists from Limburg (Netherlands)
20th-century Dutch people